Susanne Mittag (born 25 July 1958) is a German policewoman and politician of the Social Democratic Party (SPD) who has been serving as a member of the Bundestag from the state of Lower Saxony since 2013.

Political career 
Born in Cleveland, Mittag became a member of the Bundestag in the 2013 German federal election. She unsuccessfully contested Delmenhorst – Wesermarsch – Oldenburg-Land in 2013 and 2017.

In parliament, Mittag is a member of the Committee on Internal Affairs and the Committee on Food and Agriculture. Since 2018, she has also been a member of the Committee for the Scrutiny of Acoustic Surveillance of the Private Home.

In the negotiations to form a so-called traffic light coalition of the SPD, the Green Party and the Free Democratic Party (FDP) following the 2021 federal elections, Mittag was part of her party's delegation in the working group on agriculture and nutrition, co-chaired by Till Backhaus, Renate Künast and Carina Konrad.

Since the 2021 elections, Mittag has been serving as her parliamentary group’s spokesperson for agriculture and nutrition.

References

External links 

  
 Bundestag biography 

1958 births
Living people
Members of the Bundestag for Lower Saxony
Female members of the Bundestag
21st-century German women politicians
Members of the Bundestag 2021–2025
Members of the Bundestag 2017–2021
Members of the Bundestag 2013–2017
Members of the Bundestag for the Social Democratic Party of Germany